Moševići may refer to the following places in Bosnia and Herzegovina:

 Moševići (Ilijaš), village in Ilijaš municipality
 Moševići (Neum), village in the Neum municipality